Stray Cat Rock: Machine Animal  or Alleycat Rock: Machine Animal is a 1970 Japanese film. It is the fourth entry in the Stray Cat Rock or Alleycat Rock series of exploitation films initiated by Alleycat Rock: Female Boss.

Plot
A group of female bikers try to help American soldiers framed on drug charges.

Cast
Meiko Kaji
Tatsuya Fuji
Bunjaku Han as Yuri

References

External links
 
 

1970 films
Films directed by Yasuharu Hasebe
Nikkatsu films
Stray Cat Rock
1970s Japanese films